Telna may refer to:

 Țelna, a village in Ighiu commune, Alba County, Romania
 Țelna, a river in the Apuseni Mountains, Alba County, western Romania
 Telecom North America, which uses the telna brand
 Talne, a city in Cherkasy Oblast (province) of Ukraine, sometimes misspelled Telna